Georgina Toth (born March 10, 1982) is a Hungarian-born naturalized Cameroonian hammer thrower. Toth has dual citizenship in Hungary and Cameroon, and competed for Cameroon at the 2008 Summer Olympics.

Toth attended Northern Arizona University in Flagstaff, Arizona, where she competed on the women's track and field team, and graduated in 2009 with a bachelor's degree in business administration-finance and marketing.

Internationally, she finished fourth at the 16th 2008 African Championships in Athletics.

References

External links
 

1982 births
Living people
Sportspeople from Dunaújváros
Naturalized citizens of Cameroon
People with acquired Cameroonian citizenship
Cameroonian people of Hungarian descent
Hungarian emigrants to Cameroon
Cameroonian hammer throwers
Hungarian female hammer throwers
Cameroonian female athletes
Hungarian female athletes
Athletes (track and field) at the 2008 Summer Olympics
Olympic athletes of Cameroon